The Electoral district of Pastoral Districts of New England and Macleay was an electorate of the New South Wales Legislative Council at a time when some of its members were elected and the balance were appointed by the Governor. It was a new electorate created in 1851 by the expansion of the Legislative Council to 54, 18 to be appointed and 36 elected. The district is located in the north of the state and covered the Northern Tablelands region of New England and part of the Mid North Coast region, including the area to the north of the Macleay River, but excluding the area south of the Macleay River which was included in the Counties of Gloucester and Macquarie. To the north was the Pastoral Districts of Clarence and Darling Downs and to the west the Pastoral Districts of Liverpool Plains and Gwydir. Polling took place in the towns of Wellingrove, Armidale, Tenterfield, Walcha and Kempsey.

In 1856 the unicameral Legislative Council was abolished and replaced with an elected Legislative Assembly and an appointed Legislative Council. The district was represented by the Legislative Assembly electorate of New England and Macleay.

Members

Thomas Rusden went on to represent New England and Macleay in the Legislative Assembly from 1856.

Election results

1851

1855 (1)
Matthew Marsh resigned in March 1855.

1855 (2)
The election of Robert Massie was declared void.

References

Former electoral districts of New South Wales Legislative Council
1851 establishments in Australia
1856 disestablishments in Australia